The Portland Lesbian Choir (PLC) is a choir based in Portland, Oregon, in the United States. The group formed in 1986. The choir has an inclusive, "non-audition" policy that applies to "women of all ages, races, gender and sexual orientations (including straight allies), abilities, creeds, lifestyles, etc."  the only requirenent is that singers must be able to match pitch in order to sing. 

In 2016, PLC presented The Miles Fly By at Revolution Hall in celebration of its thirtieth anniversary. PLC will be presenting its June 2023 concert " Draw the circle wide" at Parkrose High school June 10th and 11th

Discography
 Making Light (1997)

References

External links

 
 
 

1986 establishments in Oregon
Choirs in Oregon
Lesbian culture in Oregon
LGBT choruses
LGBT culture in Portland, Oregon
Musical groups established in 1986